The North American Rockwell OV-10 Bronco is an American twin-turboprop light attack and observation aircraft. It was developed in the 1960s as a special aircraft for counter-insurgency (COIN) combat, and one of its primary missions was as a forward air control (FAC) aircraft. It can carry up to 3,200 lb (1,450 kg) of external munitions and internal loads such as paratroopers or stretchers, and can loiter for three or more hours.

Development

Background
The aircraft was initially conceived in the early 1960s through an informal collaboration between W.H. Beckett and Colonel K.P. Rice, U.S. Marine Corps, who met at Naval Air Weapons Station China Lake, California, and who also happened to live near each other. The original concept was for a rugged, simple, close air support aircraft integrated with forward ground operations. At the time, the U.S. Army was still experimenting with armed helicopters, and the U.S. Air Force was not interested in close air support.

The concept aircraft was to operate from expedient forward air bases using roads as runways. Speed was to be from very slow to medium subsonic, with much longer loiter times than a pure jet. Efficient turboprop engines would give better performance than piston engines. Weapons were to be mounted on the centerline to get efficient unranged aiming. The inventors favored strafing weapons such as self-loading recoilless rifles, which could deliver aimed explosive shells with less recoil than cannons, and a lower per-round weight than rockets. The airframe was to be designed to avoid the back blast.

Beckett and Rice developed a basic platform meeting these requirements, then attempted to build a fiberglass prototype in a garage. The effort produced enthusiastic supporters and an informal pamphlet describing the concept. W.H. Beckett, who had retired from the Marine Corps, went to work at North American Aviation to sell the aircraft.

Rice states:

Light Armed Reconnaissance Aircraft
A "tri-service" specification for the Light Armed Reconnaissance Aircraft (LARA) was approved by the U.S. Navy, Air Force, and Army and was issued in late 1963. The LARA requirement was based on a perceived need for a new type of "jungle fighting" versatile light attack and observation aircraft. Existing military aircraft in the observation role, such as the Cessna O-1 Bird Dog and Cessna O-2 Skymaster, were perceived as obsolescent, with too slow a speed and too small a load capacity for this flexible role.

The specification called for a twin-engine, two-man aircraft that could carry at least  of cargo, six paratroopers or stretchers, and be stressed for +8 and −3 g (basic aerobatic ability). Various armaments had to be carried, including four  machine guns with 2,000 rounds, and external weapons including a gun pod with  M197 electric cannon, and AIM-9 Sidewinder air-to-air missiles.

Eleven proposals were submitted, including: the Grumman Model 134R tandem-seat version of the already-fielded U.S. Army's OV-1 Mohawk (the U.S. Marine Corps dropped out of the Mohawk program in 1958), Goodyear GA 39, Beechcraft PD-183, Douglas D-855, Convair Model 48 Charger, Helio 1320, Lockheed CL-760, a Martin design, and the North American Aviation/Rockwell NA-300.

In August 1964, the NA-300 was selected. A contract for seven prototype aircraft was issued in October 1964. Convair protested the decision and built a small-wing prototype of the Model 48 Charger anyway, which first flew on 29 November 1964. This was also a twin-boom aircraft that had a broadly similar layout to the OV-10. The Charger, while capable of outperforming the OV-10 in some respects, crashed on 19 October 1965 after 196 test flights. Convair subsequently dropped out of contention.

The Bronco started flying midway through the Charger's test program on 16 July 1965, and became one of the premier counter-insurgency (COIN) aircraft of the next 30 years. Rice concludes:

The Bronco performed observation, forward air control, helicopter escort, armed reconnaissance, utility light air transport and limited ground attack. The Bronco has also performed aerial radiological reconnaissance, tactical air observation, artillery and naval gunfire spotting, airborne control of tactical air support operations and front-line, low-level aerial photography. A prototype in Vietnam designed to lay smoke was extremely successful, kept in service by evaluators for several months, and only reluctantly released, was not purchased due to a perceived lack of mission.

Design

The OV-10 has a central nacelle containing pilots and cargo, and twin booms containing twin turboprop engines. The visually distinctive feature of the aircraft is the combination of the twin booms, with the horizontal stabilizer that connects them.

The aircraft's design supported effective operations from forward bases. The OV-10 can perform short takeoffs and landings, including on aircraft carriers and large-deck amphibious assault ships without using catapults or arresting wires. Further, the OV-10 was designed to take off and land on unimproved sites. Repairs could be made with ordinary tools. No ground equipment was required to start the engines. If necessary, the engines could operate on high-octane automobile fuel with only a slight loss of power.

The aircraft had responsive handling and could fly for 5 1/2 hours with external fuel tanks. The cockpit had extremely good visibility for a tandem pilot and co-pilot, provided by a wrap-around "greenhouse" that was wider than the fuselage. North American Rockwell custom ejection seats were standard, with many successful ejections during service. With the second seat removed, it can carry  of cargo, five paratroopers, or two litter patients and an attendant.

The bottom of the fuselage bore sponsons or "stub wings" that improved flight performance by decreasing aerodynamic drag underneath the fuselage. The sponsons were mounted horizontally on the prototype. Testing caused them to be redesigned for production aircraft; the downward angle of the sponsons on production models ensured that stores carried on the sponsons jettisoned cleanly. Normally, four 7.62 mm (.308 in) M60C machine guns were carried on the sponsons with the M60Cs accessed through a large forward-opening hatch on the top of each sponson. The sponsons also had four racks to carry bombs, pods, or fuel. The wings outboard of the engines contain two additional racks, one per side.

Racked armament in the Vietnam War was usually seven-shot  rocket pods with white phosphorus marker rounds or high-explosive rockets, or 5 in (127 mm) four-shot Zuni rocket pods. Bombs, ADSIDS air-delivered/para-dropped unattended seismic sensors, Mk-6 battlefield illumination flares, and other stores were also carried.

Operational experience showed some weaknesses in the OV-10's design. It was significantly underpowered, which contributed to crashes in Vietnam in sloping terrain because the pilots could not climb fast enough. While specifications state that the aircraft could reach , in Vietnam the aircraft could reach only . Also, no OV-10 pilot survived ditching the aircraft.

Operational history
The OV-10 served in the U.S. Air Force, U.S. Marine Corps, and U.S. Navy, as well as in the service of a number of other countries. A total of 81 OV-10 Broncos were ultimately lost to all causes during the course of the Vietnam War, with the Air Force losing 64, the Navy 7, and the Marines 10.

U.S. Marine Corps

The OV-10 was first acquired by the U.S. Marine Corps. Each of the Marine Corps's two observation squadrons (designated VMO) had 18 aircraft – nine OV-10As and nine OV-10Ds night observation aircraft. A Marine Air Reserve observation squadron was also established. The OV-10 operated as a forward air controller and was finally phased out of the Marine Corps in 1995 following its employment during Operation Desert Storm, which also saw the final combat losses of OV-10s by U.S. forces. Among these losses were two USMC OV-10s being shot down due to a lack of effective infrared countermeasures. It was also thought that the slow speed made it more vulnerable to anti-aircraft weapons. Forward air control passed mostly to ground units with laser designators and digital radios (GFACs) and the twin-seat F/A-18D Hornet (FAC(A)s). Most operational Broncos were reassigned to civil government agencies in the U.S., while some were sold to other countries.

The U.S. Marine Corps YOV-10D Night Observation Gunship System (NOGS) program modified two OV-10As (BuNo 155395 and BuNo 155396) to include a turreted forward looking infrared (FLIR) sensor, laser target designator and turreted 20 mm (.79 in) XM197 gun slaved to the FLIR aimpoint. NOGS succeeded in Vietnam, but funds to convert more aircraft were not approved. NOGS evolved into the NOS OV-10D, which included a laser designator, but no gun.

U.S. Air Force
The USAF acquired the Bronco primarily as an FAC aircraft. The first combat USAF OV-10As arrived in Vietnam on 31 July 1968 as part of "Operation Combat Bronco", an operational testing and evaluation of the aircraft. These test aircraft were attached to the 19th Tactical Air Support Squadron, 504th Tactical Air Support Group at Bien Hoa Air Base in South Vietnam. The test roles included the full range of missions then assigned to FAC aircraft, including day and night strike direction, gunship direction, bomb damage assessment, visual reconnaissance, aerial artillery direction, and as escorts for aircraft engaged in Operation Ranch Hand. The aircraft's ability to generate smoke internally was utilized for strike direction and "in four specific instances under conditions of reduced visibility, the smoke was seen by strike aircrews before the [OV-10A] [was] detected." Operation Combat Bronco ended on 30 October 1968.

After the end of Combat Bronco, the USAF began to deploy larger numbers to the 19th TASS (Bien Hoa), 20th TASS (Da Nang Air Base), and for out-of-country missions to the 23d TASS (Nakhom Phanom in Thailand). The 23d TASS conducted Operation Igloo White, Operation Prairie Fire/Daniel Boone, and other special operations missions.

Between 1968 and 1971, 26 pilots from the Royal Australian Air Force (RAAF) and Royal New Zealand Air Force (RNZAF) flew the OV-10A on FAC sorties, while attached to USAF squadrons. The 19th TASS hosted 13 RAAF pilots and three from the RNZAF; another seven RAAF pilots and three from the RNZAF were assigned to the 20th TASS. (Consequently, the Australian War Memorial has acquired an OV-10A 67-14639, which was flown by some of these pilots.)

From April to June 1969 the USAF conducted an operational exercise called Misty Bronco in South Vietnam's III Corps Tactical Zone to evaluate the OV-10A's performance as a light strike aircraft. The results were positive and as of October 1969 all USAF OV-10As were to be armed with their internal .308 in (7.62 mm) M60C machine guns, which had generally been left out during the Combat Bronco evaluations and subsequent deployment. High explosive 2.75 in (70 mm) rockets were also authorized for use against ground targets.

In 1971, the 23d TASS's OV-10A Broncos received modifications under project Pave Nail. Carried out by LTV Electrosystems during 1970, these modifications primarily included the addition of the Pave Spot target laser designator pod, as well as a specialized night periscope (replacing the initial starlight scopes that had been used for night time operations) and LORAN equipment. The call sign Nail was the radio handle of this squadron. These aircraft supported interdiction of troops and supplies on the Ho Chi Minh Trail by illuminating targets for laser-guided bombs dropped by McDonnell F-4 Phantom IIs. After 1974, these aircraft were converted back to an unmodified OV-10A standard.

At least 157 OV-10As were delivered to the USAF before production ended in April 1969. The USAF lost 64 OV-10 Broncos during the war, to all causes. In the late 1980s, the USAF started to replace their OV-10s with OA-37B and OA-10A aircraft. Unlike the Marine Corps, the USAF did not deploy the Bronco to the Middle East in response to the Iraqi invasion of Kuwait, as it believed that the OV-10 was too vulnerable. The final two USAF squadrons equipped with the Bronco, the 19th and 21st Tactical Air Support Squadron (TASS) retired the OV-10 on 1 September 1991.

In 2012, $20 million was allocated to activate an experimental unit of two OV-10s, acquired from NASA and the State Department. Starting in May 2015, these aircraft were deployed to support Operation Inherent Resolve flying combat missions over Iraq and Syria, flying more than 120 combat sorties over 82 days. It is speculated they provided close air support for Special Forces missions. The experiment ended satisfactorily, but an Air Force spokesman stated it remains unlikely they will invest in reactivating the OV-10 on a regular basis because of the overhead cost of operating an additional aircraft type.

U.S. Navy
The U.S. Navy formed Light Attack Squadron Four (VAL-4), the "Black Ponies", on 3 January 1969, and operated in Vietnam from April 1969 to April 1972. The Navy used the Bronco OV-10A as a light ground attack aircraft, for interdiction of enemy logistics, and fire-support of Marines, SEALs and naval riverine force vessels. It succeeded in this role, although the U.S. Navy did lose seven OV-10s during the Vietnam War to various causes. Other than OV-10 Fleet replacement training done in cooperation with Air Antisubmarine Squadron Forty-One (VS-41) at NAS North Island, California, VAL-4 was the only squadron in the U.S. Navy to ever employ the OV-10 and it was decommissioned shortly following the end of the Vietnam War. VAL-4's surviving OV-10s were subsequently transferred to the Marine Corps.

At least two Broncos were used as test beds in the 1970s at the Naval Air Test Center (NATC) at NAS Patuxent River, Maryland.

Two OV-10s were evaluated for special operations, and the USMC lent 18 aircraft for operation by VAL-4 in Vietnam.

In 2015, two OV-10Gs were assigned for light attack operations in Iraq under the "Combat Dragon II" program and completed 120 missions.

In 2019, the first of two former VAL-4 aircraft returned to flight by the OV-10 Squadron, Chino, California. Bureau numbers 155493 "Holy Terror" and 155474 "White Lightning".  Extensive restoration work of more than 18 months performed by California Aerofab went into 493's return to flight and 155474 expected to fly by 2020.

Colombia
In 1991, the USAF provided the Colombian Air Force with 12 OV-10As. Later, three ex-USMC A-models were also acquired to provide parts support. Colombia operates the aircraft in a COIN role against an active insurgency. At least one aircraft has been lost in combat. The remaining OV-10As were upgraded to OV-10D standard. In November 2015, and after 24 years of service, the Colombian Air Force retired all of its remaining OV-10 aircraft.

Germany

The OV-10B variant was produced for Germany to use as target tug. Eighteen aircraft were delivered in the late 1960s and they were equipped with target towing equipment inside the fuselage. A transparent plastic dome replaced the rear cargo door and a rear seat was installed in the cargo bay to look backwards out of the dome. After a long career the Bronco was replaced by the Pilatus PC-9 in 1990 and all aircraft were retired and sent to various museums, technical schools and used as ABDR (Aircraft Battle Damage Repair).

Indonesia

The Indonesian Air Force purchased 12 OV-10F aircraft and operated them in COIN operations similar to the U.S. Navy's Vietnam missions with their Broncos, but retrofitted .50 in (12.7 mm) Browning heavy machine guns in place of the .308 in (7.62 mm) machine guns. These aircraft were based in Lanud Abdulrachman Saleh Air Force Base in Malang, East Java and were vital in the invasion of East Timor and ensuing COIN operations. In 1977, they were also used during the aerial bombardments of Amungme villages near Freeport-McMoRan area of operations, West Papua, in response to OPM attacks on the mining company facilities, and of Dani villages in Baliem Valley, also in West Papua, in response to rebellion against enforced participation in the Indonesian general election. Due to the lack of U.S. bombs, the Indonesian Air Force modified the bomb racks to carry Russian bombs. The Indonesian Air Force plans to replace their OV-10Fs with EMBRAER Super Tucanos following a fatal accident on 23 July 2013. The Indonesian Air Force retired the OV-10F from service in 2007.

Morocco
The Royal Moroccan Air Force acquired six former-U.S. Marine Corps OV-10As in 1981.  Based in Marrakesh Menara Airport, these were employed in counter-insurgency operations against Polisario forces in the Western Sahara War using rocket pods and gun pods.  One was shot down in 1985. A 15-man USMC inspection team from VMO-2 was deployed to evaluate the aforementioned crashed OV-10 155397.

Philippines

The Philippine Air Force (PAF) received 24 OV-10As from U.S. stocks in 1991, later followed by a further nine from the United States, and eight ex-Thai Air Force OV-10Cs in 2003–2004.  The OV-10s are operated by the 16th Attack Squadron and 25th Composite Attack Squadron of the 15th Strike Wing, based in Sangley Point, Cavite. The PAF flies Broncos on search-and-rescue and COIN operations in various parts of the Philippines. The first two women combat pilots in the PAF flew OV-10s with the 16th. This squadron flew anti-terrorist operations in the Jolo island.

PAF OV-10 Broncos were repeatedly used in air strikes against Moro Islamic Liberation Front positions during ongoing fighting in 2011, and two were used in an air strike in February 2012 which resulted in the death of three Abu Sayyaf and Jemaah Islamiyah commanders, among others. Philippine Air Force OV-10s have been reportedly modified in order to employ modern smart bombs.

On 1 June 2017, the PAF OV-10s dropped bombs on Maute group positions during the Battle of Marawi.

The PAF announced that its remaining OV-10s will be replaced by the Embraer EMB 314 Super Tucano by 2024. This is to meet requirements set by the AFP Modernization Act to replace the aging aircraft.

Thailand

The Royal Thai Air Force purchased 32 new OV-10C aircraft in the early 1970s for COIN usage. Reportedly Broncos won most Thai bombing competitions until F-5Es became operational. At one time, the RTAF flew OV-10s as air-defense aircraft. In 2004, RTAF donated most of the OV-10s to the Philippines. Three OV-10 survivors are displayed, one at the Tango Squadron Wing 41 Museum in Chiang Mai, the RTAF Museum in Bangkok, and a static display at the main gate of Wing 5 in Prachuap Khiri Khan. The remaining OV-10s will be donated to the PAF in 2011.

Venezuela
The Venezuelan Air Force has operated a number of new build OV-10Es and ex-USAF OV-10As over the years. On 27 November 1992, the aircraft were widely used by mutinous officers who staged an attempted coup d'état against former President Carlos Andrés Pérez. The rebels dropped bombs and launched rockets against police and government buildings in Caracas. Four Broncos were lost during the uprising, including two shot down by a loyalist General Dynamics F-16 Fighting Falcon.

Venezuela's OV-10s are to be retired in the coming years. Originally Venezuela attempted to procure Embraer Super Tucano aircraft to replace the OV-10, but no deal was achieved which President Chavez claimed was due to the result of pressure from the U.S. government. The Venezuelan government has decided not to replace them with new fixed wing aircraft. Rather, the Venezuelan Air Force is replacing them with the Russian made Mil Mi-28 attack helicopter.

Other U.S. usage

NASA

NASA has used a number of Broncos for various research programs, including studies of low speed flight carried out with the third prototype in the 1970s, and studies on noise and wake turbulence. One OV-10 remained in use at NASA's Langley base in 2009 with three additional aircraft obtained from the Department of State formerly used in drug eradication efforts.

U.S. Department of State Air Wing
The Department of State (DoS) aircraft are former Air Force OV-10A and Marine Corps OV-10D aircraft operated under contract by DynCorp International in support of U.S. drug interdiction and eradication efforts in South America.  The aircraft carry civilian U.S. aircraft registration numbers and, when not forward deployed, are home based at a DoS/DynCorp facility at Patrick Space Force Base, Florida.

The Broncos had sponsons removed and Kevlar external armor panels installed around the cockpits. On the belly was a wind driven pump adapted from Agriculture Aircraft (crop dusters) with more than a 500 gal (1,900 L) hopper tank installed in the cargo bay. A spray bar extended out to a V from the cargo bay to the tailbooms. A surviving aircraft in this configuration is on display in Tennessee.

Bureau of Land Management
The U.S. Bureau of Land Management (BLM) acquired seven OV-10As for use as fire-fighting aircraft, including the YOV-10A prototype. In this role, they lead firefighting air tankers through their intended flight paths over their target areas. The aircraft were operated in their basic military configurations, but with their ejection seats disabled. The aircraft's existing smoke system was used to mark the path for the following air tankers. Given the age of the aircraft, spare parts were difficult to obtain, and the BLM retired their fleet in 1999.

California Department of Forestry and Fire Protection

The California Department of Forestry and Fire Protection (CALFIRE) has acquired a number of OV-10As, including the six surviving aircraft from the BLM and 13 former U.S. Marine Corps aircraft in 1993 to replace their existing Cessna O-2 Skymasters as air attack aircraft. The CAL FIRE Broncos fly with a crew of two, a contract pilot and the CAL FIRE ATGS or Air Tactical Group Supervisor, whose job it is to coordinate all aerial assets on a fire with the Incident Commander on the ground. Thus, besides serving as a tanker lead-in aircraft, the OV-10A is also the aerial platform from which the entire air operation is coordinated.

Variants

YOV-10A
Seven prototype NA-300s with two 600 shp T76-G-6/8 engines, last one was flown with YT74-P-1 engines.
OV-10A
Original production version with enlarged wing and 715 shp T76-G-10/12 engines. Distinguished by a long-wire high frequency (HF) antenna between the center rear stabilizer and the central nacelle, 114 for the United States Marine Corps and 157 for the United States Air Force.
OV-10B
Target towing variant for Germany, with a target towing pod mounted beneath the fuselage. A clear dome replaced the rear cargo door. The rear seat was moved to the cargo bay to look backwards out the dome, 18 built; known as the OV-10B(Z) when fitted with an additional J85-GE-4 turbojet. 
OV-10B(Z)
A variation of the German target tug, with one J85-GE-4 turbojet mounted in a nacelle above the fuselage. A total of 18 aircraft were supplied to the Germans.
OV-10C
Export version for Thailand; based on the OV-10A, 32 built.
YOV-10D (NOGS)
The prototype Night Observation Gunship System variant developed as the YOV-10D, two OV-10A conversions, 155395,155396.

OV-10D
Second generation Bronco developed under the NOGS program. The D-model was an extensively modified OV-10A airframe, adding a forward-looking infrared night-vision system with a turret-mounted camera under an extended nose, visually distinct from the short rounded nose of the A-model. The D also has bigger engines and larger fiberglass propellers. Other noticeable external differences are the chaff dispensers installed midway down the booms and infrared-suppressive exhaust stacks (which mix the exhaust with colder air to reduce the aircraft's heat signature). 17 modified from OV-10A.
OV-10D+
The next USMC upgrade, consisting of A and D aircraft being extensively reworked at MCAS Cherry Point Naval Air Rework Facility with new wiring and strengthened wings. Engine instrumentation was changed from round dials to tape readouts.
OV-10E
Export version for Venezuela; based on the OV-10A, 16 built.
OV-10F
Export version for Indonesia; based on the OV-10A, 16 built.
OV-10G+
Designation given to OV-10s loaned from NASA to the United States Special Operations Command for evaluation under the Combat Dragon II as a counter-insurgency aircraft, featuring new Hartzell four-bladed props and an off-the-shelf sensor suite. 3 modified from OV-10D+.
OV-10M (modified)
A four-bladed version of OV-10A; modified to accommodate bigger engines with larger fiberglass props. Equipped with square chaff dispensers midway down the booms and with new wiring and strengthened wings. Engine instrumentation was changed from round dials to tape readouts by Marsh Aviation for the Philippine Air Force.

OV-10T

OV-10X
Proposed version for the USAF's Light Attack/Armed Reconnaissance contract. In 2009 Boeing put together plans internally to build a modernized, improved version of the Bronco, called the OV-10X, to satisfy a possible Air Force requirement for a light attack plane.  According to Pentagon and industry officials, while the aircraft would maintain much of its 1960s-vintage rugged external design, modernizations would include a computerized glass cockpit, intelligence sensors and smart bomb-dropping capabilities. Boeing indicated in 2009 that international interest in restarting production is growing, to compete with other light attack aircraft such as the T-6B Texan II, A-67 Dragon and EMB 314 Super Tucano.

Operators

 Philippine Air Force - 41 units with 7 in service.

 NASA

Civil operators

 Blue Air Training acquired seven OV-10D+ and G aircraft in March 2020, for use in Joint terminal attack controller training.
 OV-10 Squadron: an organization restoring seven OV-10D Broncos at Chino Airport, California. Their first restored Bronco 155493 took flight in July 2019.
 CAL FIRE
 Beaufort County Mosquito Control, Beaufort County, South Carolina.

Retired

 Colombian Air Force

 Indonesian Air Force

 Royal Moroccan Air Force

 Royal Thai Air Force

 United States Air Force
 United States Marine Corps

 Venezuelan Air Force

 German Air Force

Aircraft on display

Australia 
 67-14639 – OV-10A at the Australian War Memorial in Canberra.

Belgium 
 158294/99+18 – OV-10B at Wevelgem, Belgium. Operated by the Bronco Demo Team as G-ONAA. Previously on display at the Internationales Luftfahrtmuseum Pflumm.

France 
 158300/99+24 – OV-10B at the Musee Europeen de l'Aviation de Chasse. Registered as F-AZKM.
 158303/99+27 – OV-10B on display at the Musee Europeen de l'Aviation de Chasse.

Germany 
 158292/99+16 – OV-10B on display at Flugausstellung Hermeskeil in Hermeskeil, Rhineland-Palatinate.
 158297/99+21 – There is an ex-Bundeswehr OV-10B on outdoor display at the Militärhistorisches Museum der Bundeswehr in Dresden, Germany.
158309/99+33 – OV-10B on display at the Militärhistorisches Museum Flugplatz Berlin-Gatow.

Indonesia 
 TT-1004 – OV-10F at Karjono Park, Banjarnegara Regency, Central Java
 TT-1006 – OV-10F on display next to the major intersection at Jombang Regency, East Java
 TT-1008 – OV-10F at Soesilo Soedarman Museum, Cilacap Regency, Central Java
 TT-1010 – OV-10F at Museum Bhakti TNI, Cilangkap, East Jakarta, Jakarta
 TT-1012 – OV-10F on display near Trunojoyo Airport, Sumenep, Madura Island, East Java
 TT-1013 – OV-10F on display at Abdul Rachman Saleh AFB, Malang, East Java
 TT-1015 – OV-10F at the Dirgantara Mandala Museum, Sleman Regency, Special Region of Yogyakarta
 TT-1016 – OV-10F on display at Abdul Rachman Saleh AFB, Malang, East Java

Thailand 
 158405 – OV-10C with Royal Thai Air Force markings is on display at the Royal Thai Air Force Museum in Bangkok.
 An OV-10C is on static display next to the main gate at Wing 5 in the town of Prachuap Khiri Khan about four hours South of Bangkok. It is open to the public every day.
 158138 – Unidentified variant OV-10 on static display at Kasetsart University in Sakon Nakhon province.

United Kingdom 
 158302/99+26 – OV-10B under restoration to airworthiness at Duxford, England. Owned by the Bronco Demo Team.
 158308/99+32 – OV-10B at Duxford, England. Operated by the Bronco Demo Team as G-BZGK. This aircraft crashed at Cotswold Airport on 10 July 2012.

United States 

 The production mockup of the OV-10A, c/n NAA-001, made in Columbus, Ohio, is on display at the Fort Worth Aviation Museum, Fort Worth, Texas, along with two other OV-10s.
67-14623 – An OV-10A is on display at the Museum of Aviation, Robins AFB, Georgia.
67-14626 – An OV-10A is on display at the Hurlburt Field Air Park at Hurlburt Field, Florida
68-03787 – An OV-10A is on display at the National Museum of the United States Air Force at Wright-Patterson AFB near Dayton, Ohio
68-03825 – An OV-10A is on display at the Fort Worth Aviation Museum, Fort Worth, Texas.
152880 – OV-10D on display outdoors at Mid America Air Museum, Liberal, Kansas. This aircraft was originally a YOV-10A.
152881 – One of the original prototype YOV-10As was on display at the Yankee Air Museum at Willow Run Airport near Ypsilanti, Michigan. It had been fully restored by a former OV-10 crew chief. The aircraft was destroyed along with several other museum aircraft in a fire on 9 October 2004.
155409 – An OV-10D is on display at the Valiant Air Command Warbird Museum at Space Coast Regional Airport in Titusville, FL.  This aircraft previously served with Marine Observation Squadron TWO (VMO-2) and was later transferred to the U.S. Department of State Air Wing at nearby Patrick Space Force Base, Florida.
155426 – An OV-10A in Marine Corps markings is on display at the Fort Worth Aviation Museum, Fort Worth, Texas.
155472 – An OV-10D in Navy markings is on display at the National Naval Aviation Museum at NAS Pensacola, Florida. This OV-10 was received by the NNAM on 21 Oct 2004 when it was transferred from the National Museum of the Marine Corps at MCB Quantico, Virginia. BuNo 155472 was originally an OV-10A which flew with VAL-4 during the Vietnam War, but was later transferred to the Marine Corps and upgraded to OV-10D standard in 1991. Bureau Number 155472 is currently repainted and displayed in the scheme of VAL-4. Formerly on display at the Carolinas Aviation Museum.
155494 – An OV-10D in Marine Corps markings is on display at the Flying Leathernecks Museum at MCAS Miramar, California.
155499 – An OV-10D with Marine Observation Squadron 1 (VMO-1) markings is on display at the Pima Air & Space Museum, adjacent to Davis-Monthan AFB in Tucson, Arizona. It is on loan from the National Naval Aviation Museum and the National Museum of the Marine Corps.
158301/99+25 – OV-10B flying for the Cactus Air Force museum. This aircraft has been reconfigured as an OV-10A.
158304/99+28 – OV-10B flying for Stallion 51 at Kissimmee Gateway Airport in Kissimmee, Florida. This aircraft has been reconfigured as an OV-10A.

Specifications (OV-10D)

See also

References

Notes

Bibliography
 Burrows, William E. "Legends of Vietnam: Bronco’s Tale." Air & Space, Volume 24, Issue 7, March 2010, pp. 60–67.
 Donald, David. The Complete Encyclopedia of World Aircraft. London: Brown Packaging Books Ltd., 1997. .
 Dorr, Robert F. and Robert J Mills. "Rockwell's Coin Machine". Air International, Vol. 42, No. 6, June 1992, pp. 321–330. Stamford, UK: Key Publishing. ISSN 0306-5634.
 Harrison, Marshall. A Lonely Kind of War: A Forward Air Controller (Vietnam). New York: Presidio Press, 1997. .
 Macknight, Nigel. "NASA's Quiet Side: Part Two, The OV-10 Bronco". Air International, Vol. 42, No 6, June 1992, pp. 331–333. Stamford, UK: Key Publishing. ISSN 0306-5634.
 Mesko, Jim. OV-10 Bronco in Action. Carrollton, Texas: Squadron/Signal Publications, 1995. .
 Myrsky, Peter. "The 'Black Ponies' of VAL-4". Air Enthusiast, Thirty-two, December 1986 – April 1987, pp. 76–78. Bromley, UK: Pilot Press, 1987. ISSN 0143-5450.
 Polmar, Norman. The Naval Institute Guide To The Ships And Aircraft Of The U.S. Fleet. Annapolis, Maryland: Naval Institute Press, 2004. .
 Potter, Joseph V. OV-10 Operation in SEAsia. Headquarters, Pacific Air Force, Directorate, Tactical Evaluation, CHECO Division, 1969.
 Willis, David. "Database: North American Bronco". Aeroplane, Vol. 38 No. 1, Issue 441, January 2010, pp. 59–76. ISSN 0143-7240.
 Wood, Richard H. Flying the Rustic Way: OV-10 Bronco Missions Over Cambodia. Air Enthusiast 115, January–February 2005, pp. 20–25

Further reading

 Harrison, Marshall. A Lonely Kind of War: A Forward Air Controller (Vietnam). New York: Presidio Press, 1997. .
 Lavell, Kit. Flying Black Ponies: The Navy's Close Air Support Squadron in Vietnam. Annapolis, Maryland: Naval Institute Press, 2009. .

External links

 The OV-10 Bronco Association site
 Historical documentation by the inventor, Col. K.P. Rice, USMC retired
 NTSB report LAX97GA205 detailing a BLM OV-10A fatal crash, archived on Landings.com
 Company brochure on proposed modernized OV-10D (OV-10X)
 Excerpt from the film One Tough Ride, The Story of the OV-10 Bronco
 Tough Little Jungle Fighter, Popular Science, December 196

OV-10 Bronco
Twin-boom aircraft
V-10O Bronco
V-10O Bronco
High-wing aircraft
OV-10X
Twin-turboprop tractor aircraft
Aircraft first flown in 1965
STOL aircraft